Dessewffy is a noble family of Hungary.

Dessewffy may refer to:

Arisztid Dessewffy
Aurél Dessewffy 
Aurél Dessewffy (1846–1928)
Emil Dessewffy

See also
List of titled noble families in the Kingdom of Hungary

Dessewffy family